The 2022 E3 Saxo Bank Classic was a road cycling one-day race that took place on 25 March 2022 in Belgium. It was the 64th edition of the E3 Saxo Bank Classic, and the 9th event of the 2022 UCI World Tour.

Teams
Twenty-five teams were invited to the race, including all eighteen UCI WorldTeams and seven UCI ProTeams. 

UCI WorldTeams

 
 
 
 
 
 
 
 
 
 
 
 
 
 
 
 
 
 

UCI ProTeams

Result

References

E3 Saxo Bank Classic
E3 Saxo Bank Classic
E3 Saxo Bank Classic
2022